Angel is a 2017 Telugu language fantasy comedy film written and directed by Palani and produced by Bhuvan Sagar. The film stars Naga Anvesh and Hebah Patel in lead roles with Suman, Saptagiri, Sayaji Shinde, Kabir Duhan Singh, and Pradeep Rawat in supporting roles. The film's music was composed by Bheems Ceciroleo with cinematography by Gunasekaran. The film was released on 3 November 2017 and was dubbed and released in Tamil as Vinnaithaandi Vandha Angel. Later the film was dubbed in Hindi as Angel in 2018.

Cast
Naga Anvesh as Nani
Hebah Patel as Nakshatra, Indra's daughter
Suman as Indra
Saptagiri as Giri
Kabir Duhan Singh as Garuda
Sayaji Shinde
Pradeep Rawat

Soundtrack
The music is composed by Bheems Ceciroleo

Critical reception
123Telugu wrote "On the whole, Angel is just an okay socio-fantasy entertainer which has some moments here and there. Hebah Patel’s performance and some good visuals are basic assets for the film." Indiaglitz wrote "A half-baked socio-fantasy that meets Kranthi Madhav's on-screen social agenda. Utterly predictable, the film treats almost everything half-heartedly." Telugu cinema wrote "Angel' is a formulaic socio-fantasy-comedy with no surprises in store. The hero's characterization suffers in the second half. Poor visuals, outdated villainy and a largely uninspiring comedy fail it."

References

External links
 

2017 films
2010s Telugu-language films
Indian fantasy action films
2010s fantasy action films
2017 directorial debut films
Films scored by Bheems Ceciroleo